Indian Cowboy is a 2004 South Asian independent feature film that belongs to a growing list of independently produced films in North America by filmmakers of South Asian descent. Featuring a bevy of South Asian actors including Sheetal Sheth, this film premiered at the Rhode Island International Film Festival in August 2004 and was released in North America on February 23, 2007.

Indian Cowboy released on Amazon Prime streaming in May 2016. Writer/Filmmaker Nikhil Kamkolkar spoke about it with Mashable and referred to the true democratization of distribution for filmmakers.

References

External links
 
 

American independent films
2004 films
2004 romantic comedy films
Films about Indian Americans
Comedy films about Asian Americans
Asian-American romance films
2004 independent films
2000s American films